Polyakov is a Russian-language surname.

Polyakov  or Poliakov may also refer to:

 Polyakov (rural locality), name of several rural localities in Russia
 Poliakov (vodka), a French vodka brand
 Polyakov action, two-dimensional action of a conformal field theory describing the worldsheet of a string in string theory

See also
 't Hooft–Polyakov monopole, a topological soliton similar to the Dirac monopole but without any singularities